Kanoê or Kapishana is a nearly extinct language isolate of Rondônia, Brazil. The Kapishana people now speak Portuguese or other indigenous languages from intermarriage.

The language names are also spelled Kapixana, Kapixanã, and Canoé, the last shared with Awa-Canoeiro.

The Kanoê people, although disperse in the southeastern part of the state of Rondônia, live mainly along the Guaropé River. The language is nearly extinct, with only 5 speakers in a population of about 319 Kanoê people.

Classification
Although Kanoê is generally considered to be a language isolate, there have been various proposals linking it with other languages and language families.

Van der Voort (2005) observes similarities among Kanoê, Kwaza, and Aikanã, but believes the evidence is not strong enough to definitively link the three languages together as part of a single language family.

Price (1978) proposes a relationship with the Nambikwaran languages, while Kaufman (1994, 2007) suggests that Kunza is related.

Language contact
Jolkesky (2016) notes that there are lexical similarities with Kwaza, Aikanã, and the Nambikwaran languages due to contact.

History

The first contact of the Kanoé people with the "white man" brought a lot of death through sickness. Many of the people died of pertussis, measles, and stomach problems since they did not have the medicine needed to fight the diseases that were available to the "white man". There was also a lot of death due to conflicts with the farmers in the area.

The Kanoê people can be found in two main areas, the banks of the Guaporé River and the Omorê River. The main population, living by Guaporé River, share the land with other indigenous people and a long history of cohabitation with the "white man".  Most of them are inserted into the Brazilian society and married to people belonging to other indigenous groups. Only three of them still speak the Kanoê language today.

By the Omerê River, a single family of Kanoê can be found, with much less influence from the Brazilian society. Having fled into a forest reserve, this group is considered isolated indigenous people, only allowing outside contact in 1995 after many years of attempts by the Ethno Environmental Protection Front. As of 2003, only four people remained of this Kanoê family, with two of them being monolingual Kanoê speakers. The area by the Omerê River is believed to be the original territory of the Kanoê people by Victor Dequech (1942) and Etta Becker-Donner (1955).

Current status

For a long time Kanoê was too poorly attested to classify. Various proposals were advanced on little evidence; Price (1978) for example thought Kanoê might be one of the Nambikwaran languages. When it was finally described in some detail, by Bacelar (2004), it turned out to be a language isolate. It is believed to have been a naturally developed language, adapted to the needs of the Kanoê people.

The first written study of the Kanoê language available today, dates back to 1943 when Stanislav Zach published a vocabulary of the Kanoê tribe, which was later updated in 1963 by Cestmír Loukotka.

A preliminary report of the phonological features of the Kanoê language was published by Laércio Bacelar in 1992, with a second report and an analysis of the phonology published in 1994. Bacelar and Cleiton Pereira wrote a paper on the morphosyntax of the language in 1996. And in 1998 a paper on the negation and litotes of the language was published by Bacelar and Augusto Silva Júnior. Since then, Laércio Bacelar has been the main linguist investigating the language and working alongside the Kanoê people. In 2004 he published a detailed description of its phonology, grammar and syntax.

A project called Etnografia e Documentação da Lingua Kanoé is underway with a lexicographic and ethnographic approach to record auditory and written data of the Kanoê language. The project is currently coordinated by Laércio Nora Bacelar, a Brazilian linguist, and is funded by FUNAI - Museu do Índio and by UNESCO. The project also has the support of the entire Kanoê community from both the Guaropé and the Omorê rivers.

Phonology

Consonants

Vowels

Oral vowels are optionally nasalized next to nasal stops, with the variation of phonemically nasal vowels.  varies as  after  and next to an approximant.  varies as  after voiceless consonants.  varies as  after . Vowels may have a voiceless offglide (effectively ) when not followed by a voiced sound.

Vowels are long when they constitute a morpheme of their own. Stress is on the last syllable of a word. Maximally complex syllable is CGVG, where G is a glide , or, due to epenthesis in certain morphological situations or to elision, the final consonant may be . One of the more syllabically complex words is  'to shave'. Vowel sequences occur, as in  'chief'.

Morphology

Kanoê is a polysynthetic language, where the more complex words are the verbs (Payne 1997). It is also primarily an agglutinative language, and many words are formed by simple roots, juxtaposition and suffixation. The gender can be expressed by suffixation or by a hyperonym, and while Kanoê does not make a distinction of number, it does make a distinction between uncountable and countable nouns, where the suffix {-te} is added
. The syntax order of Kanoê follows SOV = subject + object + verb.

In the Kanoê language, the process of morphological reduplication is used to form frequentative verbs.  For example, manamana 'kneading', or mañumañu 'chewing'. Although some names show reduplication, it can have an onomatopoeic motivation instead of a morphologic one - most names with reduplication are names for animals and birds, in which the phonetic sequence of the reduplication do seem to imitate the sounds characteristic of said animals, for example kurakura 'chicken' or tsõjtsõj 'hummingbird'.

Pronouns

Personal pronouns

Personal pronouns in the Kanoê language follow a monomorphic free form in the singular and bimorphic in the plural. These pronouns can occur in the subject or object position. The formation of the plural pronouns follow the formula PRO.PL → PRO.SG + COL, where PRO is the singular form of the pronoun and  -COL is the plural morpheme {-te}.

For example:

Possessive pronouns

The form for possessive pronouns are monomorphic in the POSS.1SG ña and POSS.2SG pjs but bimorphic for POSS.3SG oho which is formed by 3SG oj plus the possessive {-o}. The plural form for the possessive pronouns are formed by adding the suffix {-to} which in itself is the result of the suffixes {-te} plus {-o}.

For example:

Demonstrative pronouns

There are only two demonstrative pronouns in the Kanoê language, jũ, "this" for objects in close proximity and ũko, "that" for objects at a distance. The demonstrative pronouns do not make a distinction between number or gender.

For example:

Indefinite pronouns

There are a total of four indefinite pronouns, which are used based on the object. The  and  pronouns can be used with the gender suffix {-kɨ̃j} for masculine and {-nake} for feminine.

For Example:

Syntax

The Kanoê language is a nominative-accusative language, given that the subjects of both transitive and intransitive verbal actions are marked the same way, while the object is marked differently. For subjects of either intransitive or transitive verbal actions, the suffix {-ro} 'CLV' is added to the verb, and for direct objects of transitive sentences, the suffix {-to} 'TR' is added to the verb.

For example:

In example a. it can be seen that the intransitive verb {iriri-} "run" takes one subject kani "child", and the morpheme {-ro} which attaches the subject as the agent of the verbal action. In example b. the transitive verb {vara-} "speak" takes a subject, pja e "your woman", which the morpheme {-ro} attaches as the subject of the verbal action; and an object, ña kani "my child", which the morpheme {-to} attaches as the object of the verbal action. Examples a. and b. show that the morphemes for subjects of transitive or intransitive verbal actions are the same.

Comparing examples c. and d. it can be seen that the morpheme {-ro} is used when atiti "corn" is the subject of the verbal action, and {-to} is used when atiti "corn" is the object of the verbal action. It shows that morphemes for subjects and objects of verbal actions are different.

Semantics

A field study by Bacelar (2004), shows that there are no inflections for number in the language. even though the Kanoê language uses the pluralizer {-te} to interpret nouns as a collective derived by the suffixation. Mass nouns cannot be pluralized.

Quantifier

The most used method to express quantity in the Kanoê language is the anteposition of the quantifier arakere "many". It is presumed that the quantifier arakere is formed by a litotes mechanism and that its internal structure follows {ara-} "few" + {-k} 'NEG' + {-e} 'DECL' + {-re} 'AUX'.

The quantifier arakere can also be used together with numerals to change its meaning to "few":

The Kanoê language also has an interrogative quantifier nẽtoe "how many" which is used at the beginning of the sentence:

See also

Macro-Paesan languages

References

CLV:verbal classifier

Language isolates of South America
Indigenous languages of Western Amazonia
Endangered language isolates
Endangered indigenous languages of the Americas
Mamoré–Guaporé linguistic area